Drosophila helvetica  is a rare European species of fruit fly from the family Drosophilidae. It seems to be associated with humid woodland habitat, and sometimes found near farms.

References 

h
Muscomorph flies of Europe